Liga Deportiva Universitaria de Quito's 2000 season was the club's 70th year of existence, the 47th year in professional football, and the 40th in the top level of professional football in Ecuador.

Kits
Supplier: Umbro
Sponsor(s): Parmalat, Ecuatoriana

Squad

Competitions

Serie A

First stage

Results

Second stage

Results

Aggregate table

Copa Libertadores

Copa Libertadores squad

First stage

References
RSSSF - 2000 Serie A 
RSSSF - 2000 Copa Libertadores

External links
Official Site 
LDU Quito (2) - Macará (2) 2nd goal
LDU Quito (4) - Emelec (1) 3rd goal
LDU Quito (2) - El Nacional (4) 2nd goal
LDU Quito (1) - ESPOLI (1)
LDU Quito (3) - Olmedo (3) 1st goal

2000
Ldu